The 1992–93 ADT Security Systems Rugby Union County Championship was the 93rd edition of England's County Championship rugby union club competition.

Lancashire won their 16th title after defeating Yorkshire in the final.

The Championship was now so far behind the Courage League in terms of priorities that a decision was made to make the following season's edition only eligible to players from teams outside the top two divisions of the Courage League.

Final

See also
 English rugby union system
 Rugby union in England

References

Rugby Union County Championship
County Championship (rugby union) seasons